Mary Kid (born Marie Anna Albertine Keul; 8 August 1901 – 29 October 1988) was a German actress. She appeared in more than forty films during the Weimar Republic, but her career came to an end in the early sound era.

Selected filmography
 Harun al Raschid (1924)
 Jealousy (1925)
 Semi-Silk (1925)
 Love and Trumpets (1925)
 Rags and Silk (1925)
 Upstairs and Downstairs (1925)
 Accommodations for Marriage (1926)
 We Belong to the Imperial-Royal Infantry Regiment (1926)
 White Slave Traffic (1926)
 The Glass Boat (1927)
 The Lady with the Tiger Skin (1927)
 Lützow's Wild Hunt (1927)
 The False Prince (1927)
 I Was a Student at Heidelberg (1927)
 Circus Renz (1927)
 The Beloved of His Highness (1928)
 Rasputin (1928)
 Scampolo (1928)
 The Duty to Remain Silent (1928)
 Song (1928)
 The Missing Wife (1929)
 The Mistress and her Servant (1929)
 Lieutenant of His Majesty (1929)
 Diary of a Coquette (1929)
 General Babka (1930)
 The Uncle from Sumatra (1930)
 The Charmer (1931)
 Kennst Du das Land (1931)

Bibliography
 Hardt, Ursula. From Caligari to California: Erich Pommer's Life in the International Film Wars. Berghahn Books, 1996.

External links

1901 births
1988 deaths
German film actresses
German silent film actresses
Actresses from Hamburg
20th-century German actresses